Richard Bruce Arthur (2 November 1921 – 22 March 1998) was an Australian freestyle wrestler who won a silver medal in the middleweight division at the 1950 British Empire Games; he finished fourth in 1954. He competed at the 1948 Summer Olympics, but was eliminated after three bouts.

In the 1950s, Arthur joined the artist colony at Dunmoochin in rural Victoria owned by Clifton Pugh where he learnt to weave and became fascinated by the process. After heading to far north Queensland, Arthur, with wife and fellow artist-weaver, Deanna Conti, established a tapestry atelier, Brudea Studio, on Timana Island, off the Cassowary Coast in Rockingham Bay. They leased the island and initially sold work to tourists before working on commission with other Australian artists. In the early days of the Atelier, his main role was making looms and the dyeing of wool. Arthur left Timana, relocating in 1973 to Dunk Island where he established the Dunk Island Tapestry Atelier. 

Arthur remained on the island until his death in 1998.

References

1921 births
1998 deaths
Olympic wrestlers of Australia
Wrestlers at the 1948 Summer Olympics
Australian male sport wrestlers
Commonwealth Games medallists in wrestling
Commonwealth Games silver medallists for Australia
Wrestlers at the 1950 British Empire Games
Wrestlers at the 1954 British Empire and Commonwealth Games
Medallists at the 1950 British Empire Games